Tando Muhammad Khan District is a district in the southern part of Sindh province in Pakistan. In north of the district, Hyderabad and Tando Allahyar districts are located; Badin district lies on south and east; and West boundary is shared with Sujawal District. The Indus River flows through Northwest. Tando Muhammad Khan district comprises the three talukas of Tando Muhammad Khan (also the biggest town in the district), Bulri Shah Karim and Tando Ghulam Hyder.

History 

The district is named after the city of Tando Muhammad Khan, founded by Mir Muhammad Khan Shahwani Talpur. It is located at a distance of 35 km from Hyderabad on the Badin-Hyderabad National Highway.

Tando Muhammad Khan district was formed by dividing the Hyderabad district along with Matiari and Tando Allahyar districts in 2005.

Demography
At the time of the 2017 census, Tando Muahmmad Khan district had a population of 677,098, of which 349,122 were males and 327,888 females. The rural population was 535,061 (79.02%) and urban 142,037 (20.98%). The literacy rate is 31.96%: 41.03% for males and 22.31% for females.

Religion

The majority religion is Islam, with 77.53% of the population. Hinduism (including those from Scheduled Castes) is practiced by 22.25% of the population.

Languages 

At the time of the 2017 census, 94.51% of the population spoke Sindhi, 1.69% Urdu and 1.07% Punjabi as their first language.

Health 

National Institute of Cardiovascular Diseases (NICVD) opened its satellite centre in Tando Mohammad Khan, it became the 4th city to have such facility in Sindh province. Facility would provide cardiac treatment services to people of Thatta, Badin, Tharparkar and adjoining areas, as well. People of this area could not even travel to Karachi for treatment of cardiac ailments but now they could avail state of the art cardiac treatment closer to their abodes. In Sindh, around 30,000 to 40,000 children are born with congenital heart disease or with defective hearts at the time of birth, but only a few hundred of them are diagnosed and get treated while thousands remain undiagnosed due to non-availability of heart health facilities in their area. In particular, from Tando Muhammad Khan to Thatta, Badin, Tharparkar and adjoining areas, thousands of children are born with congenital heart disease but they remain undiagnosed throughout their life and eventually die without treatment.

Climate 
The climate of the area is moderate. However. April, May and June are very hot during the day time. December and January are the coldest months with maximum and minimum temperatures of 30 °C and 10 °C respectively. Rainfall is highly erratic with an average of about 130 mm. The monsoon dominates from July to September.

Agriculture 
70% of the district population is engaged in agriculture. Main crops grown in the district are: sugarcane, rice, wheat and cotton. Phuleli, Pinyari and Akram canal are the main source of water-reservoir for irrigation in this district. There are many rice mills operating in Tando Mohammad khan district.

According to the 2017 census of Pakistan, the population of Tando Muhammad Khan District of Sindh was 677228: 350010 male, 327202 female, and 16 transgender. Average annual growth rate was 2.31% from 1998 to 2017.

Administration 
Tando Muhammad Khan is administratively subdivided into 3 tehsils, these are:
Bulri Shah Karim
Tando Ghulam Hyder
Tando Muhammad Khan
Mr. Tauqeer Muhammad Naeem, PSP is holding the working as the Senior Superintendent of Police of the District w.e.from 21-06-2018.

Education 
District Tando Muhammad Khan is ranked at the 115th position in the education score index of the Pakistan District Education Rankings 2017 published by Alif Ailaan. The education score comprises the learning score, retention score and gender parity score. Retention is one of the biggest concerns in this district, with the relevant score being only 31.14 out of a potential 100.

In the middle school infrastructure score index, which focuses on availability of basic facilities and the building condition of schools, Tando Muhammad Khan ranks 86th. The lack of electricity and drinking water in schools remain a concern in the district, along with unsatisfactory building conditions.

On the TaleemDo! App, residents of several areas within Tando Muhammad Khan have complained about the quality of the syllabus and outdated textbooks. In government schools, where textbooks are supposed to be provided to every child free of cost, parents have complained of being charged for these items. The debate over the medium of instruction is as relevant in Tando Muhammad Khan as other districts of Sindh, where many demand for basic education to be provided in Sindhi, rather than in Urdu or English.

List of Union Councils
Tando Muhammad Khan District has the following 17 Union Councils:

List of Dehs
The following is a list of Tando Muhammad Khan District's dehs, organised by taluka:

 Tando Ghulam Hyder Taluka (54 dehs)
 Adhanki
 Ahmedani
 Ajaib Pur
 Arazi
 Bariji
 Bhanki
 Chachri
 Chak
 Chandia
 Charo
 Choubandi
 Dando
 Dauki
 Debgeri
 Doderi
 Fateh Bagh
 Gulshan
 Habach
 Jagsiyani
 Jahbgeri
 Jarki
 Jiayath
 Jio
 Jonathi
 Joon
 Jumoon Jakhro
 Karo Mehro
 Kath Bhambhen
 Khaso
 Kodario
 Kor Rahimoon
 Lakara
 Lakhi
 Lashari
 Machari
 Mahi Laghari
 Malana
 Malook Pur
 Moya
 Nazar Pur
 Noohani
 Palandi
 Parori
 Peroz Pur
 Ringyoon
 Saherki
 Samradi
 Seri
 Sethari
 Tando Ghulam Hyder
 Tali
 Thorki
 Unerki
 Vedho Chowro
 Tando Muhammad Khan Taluka (29 dehs)
 Abri
 Baberki
 Bozdar
 Burira
 Chano Katiar
 Digh
 Fatehpur
 Kari
 Khanto
 Kora
 Lakhat
 Larh
 Nango Shah
 Pad Ram Diyali
 Patghahi
 Pattar
 Ram Diyali Wasan
 Roshnai
 Samabani
 Shah Bukhari
 Sheikh Bhirkhio
 Siddiquepur
 Singh
 Soomerki
 Sutiari
 Tando Muhammad Khan
 Thari
 Vesarki
 Veseria
 Bulri Shah Karim Taluka (76 dehs)
 Abad
 Abdumehndo
 Alipur
 Allo Katiar
 Amerki
 Aripota
 Barchani
 Beharan
 Behranpur
 Bhahera
 Bhalal
 Bhanbri
 Bulri
 Chaudaro
 Chhari
 Chorki Jagir
 Dadoonki
 Deghi
 Dhandaboo
 Dhandhi
 Dhatt
 Daharki
 Din Pur
 Dodi
 Doulatpur
 Ganghyari
 Hajipur
 Heran Jagir
 Homki
 Jado Laghari
 Jalalani
 Jamerki
 Jati
 Jhok
 Kamaro
 Kandar
 Kass
 Kathor
 Katiar
 Keenjhar
 Khadho
 Khalasi
 Khalso
 Kheersar
 Khiyari
 Khokhar
 Khoski
 Kolab Rayatee
 Kumb
 Ladhan
 Loonlelo
 Meeranpur
 Nakurji
 Narki
 Pakhro
 Pakhyarki
 Pir Wah
 Qaboolpur
 Qaboolpur-II
 Qanadani
 Rain
 Rayati Shor
 Saidpur
 Sahrani
 Samejani
 Samepotani
 Sandki
 Sathiar
 Shorki
 Sonehri
 Soomerki
 Soomra
 Soorjani
 Sun
 Tikhar
 Umaid Ali Jat

References

Bibliography
http://www.ndma.gov.pk/Publications/Development%20Profile%20District%20Tando%20Muhammad%20Khan.pdf

 
Districts of Sindh